Paid in Full may refer to:

Music
 Paid in Full Entertainment, a record label 
 Paid in Full (album), a 1987 hip-hop album by Eric B. & Rakim
 "Paid in Full" (Eric B. & Rakim song), a 1987 song from the above album
 "Paid in Full" (Sonata Arctica song), a 2007 metal song by Sonata Arctica from the album Unia
 Paid in Full (soundtrack), the soundtrack to the 2002 film

Film and theatre
 Paid in Full (play), a 1908 play by Eugene Walter
 Paid in Full (1919 film), a 1919 film based on the 1908 play
 Paid in Full (1914 film), a lost 1914 silent film drama
 Paid in Full (1950 film), directed by William Dieterle
 Paid in Full (2002 film), directed by Charles Stone III

Other
 In law and accounting, a debt, bill, invoice, or claim that has been fully paid; an executed contract.